Ugbana Oyet (born September 1976) is a Nigerian-born British chartered engineer and the current Serjeant-at-Arms of the House of Commons. Oyet is the first Black Serjeant-at-Arms.

Early life 
Oyet was born in Nigeria in 1976 and moved to the United Kingdom with his family in 1991.

Oyet was educated in Chichester, West Sussex. It was whilst at school in Chichester that he met Claire, his future wife.

Oyet attended the University of Southampton, studying electrical engineering.

Career 
Oyet began working at Parliament in 2012 as Parliament's Principal Electrical Engineer and led efforts to make the parliamentary estate carbon neutral by 2050 before his appointment as Serjeant-at-Arms.

Oyet was appointed as Serjeant-at-Arms in October 2019.

Personal life 
He is married to Claire. They have four children, three sons and a daughter.

References

1976 births
Living people
British electrical engineers
Nigerian emigrants to the United Kingdom
Serjeants-at-Arms of the British House of Commons
People from Chichester